The New Flesh may refer to:
 The New Flesh (Nine Inch Nails song)
 The New Flesh (The Wildhearts song)